Trigonodesma is a monotypic moth genus of the family Erebidae. Its only species, Trigonodesma bimacula, is found in the Philippines. Both the genus and the species were first described by Wileman and South in 1921.

The Global Lepidoptera Names Index gives this name as a synonym of Rema Swinhoe, 1900.

References

Calpinae
Monotypic moth genera